Luis Fernando López (born 1964) is a Bolivian politician and military officer.

Luis Fernando López may also refer to:
 Luis Fernando López (racewalker) (born 1979), Colombian racewalker
 Luis Fernando López Figueroa, (born 1992), Mexican footballer
 Luis Fernando López Payan, (born 1999), Mexican footballer

Fictional characters 
 Luis Fernando Lopez (character), Grand Theft Auto character